The Barron Library is a historic building located at 582 Rahway Avenue in Woodbridge Township of Middlesex County, New Jersey. Formerly a public library, it is now the Barron Arts Center. The building was documented by the Historic American Buildings Survey in 1976.  It was added to the National Register of Historic Places on November 11, 1977, for its significance in architecture and education.

History and description
Thomas Barron (1790–1875) funded the construction of the building in his will. It would become the first free public library in Middlesex County. The brownstone building was designed by architect J. Cleaveland Cady in the Richardsonian Romanesque style and features a three-story clock tower. The fireplace in the Reading Room is bordered with blue and white Delft tiles, each depicting a biblical scene. The library was dedicated on September 11, 1877. In 1967, it became part of the Woodbridge Township Library System. In 1977, the building became the arts center for Woodbridge Township.

See also
 National Register of Historic Places listings in Middlesex County, New Jersey
 List of museums in New Jersey

References

External links
 
 
 
 

Woodbridge Township, New Jersey
1877 establishments in New Jersey
Richardsonian Romanesque architecture in New Jersey
Historic American Buildings Survey in New Jersey
National Register of Historic Places in Middlesex County, New Jersey
Libraries on the National Register of Historic Places in New Jersey
New Jersey Register of Historic Places